Newburyport Car Manufacturing Company was a street car builder in Newburyport, Massachusetts from 1887–1905. Business began with horsecars, but the company folded due to the introduction of electric street cars.

Products
 SE DT streetcar

Clients
 Montreal Street Railway Company

References
 Newburyport Car Manufacturing Company

Horsecar manufacturers
Companies based in Newburyport, Massachusetts